Chrosiothes silvaticus is a species of comb-footed spider in the family Theridiidae. It is found from the US to Ecuador.

References

Theridiidae
Spiders described in 1894
Spiders of North America